Zhou Jiping (born 1952) is the general manager and then chairman of the China National Petroleum Corporation (CNPC).

Education
Zhou Jiping graduated from China University of Petroleum in Geology.

Career

Since 2013, Zhou Jiping has served as Chairman and CEO of China National Petroleum Corporation.

References

1952 births
Living people
Chinese businesspeople
Petroleum engineers
Chinese geologists